China Construction Bank Corporation (CCB) is one of the "big four" banks in China. In 2015, CCB was the 2nd largest bank in the world by market capitalization and 6th largest company in the world. The bank has approximately 13,629 domestic branches. In addition, it maintains overseas branches in Barcelona, Frankfurt, Luxembourg, Hong Kong, Johannesburg, New York City, Seoul, Singapore, Tokyo, Melbourne, Kuala Lumpur, Santiago de Chile, Brisbane, Sydney and Auckland, and a wholly owned subsidiary in London. Its total assets reached CN¥ 8.7 trillion in 2009, and it is considered a systemically important bank by the Financial Stability Board. Its headquarters is in Xicheng District, Beijing.

History

CCB was founded on 1 October 1954 under the name of People's Construction Bank of China, and later changed to China Construction Bank on 26 March 1996.

In January 2002, CCB Chairman Wang Xuebing resigned from the bank after being charged with accepting bribes while he was employed with Bank of China; he was sentenced to 12 years in prison. In March 2005, his successor, Zhang Enzhao, resigned for "personal reasons". Just prior to his resignation, he had been charged in a lawsuit with accepting a US$1 million bribe. He was later sentenced to 15 years in jail in connection with the case.

China Construction Bank Corporation was formed as a joint-stock commercial bank in September 2004 as a result of a separation procedure undertaken by its predecessor, China Construction Bank, under the PRC Company Law. Following the China Banking Regulatory Committee's approval on 14 September 2004, the next day the bank (Jianyin) became a separate legal entity, owned by the Chinese government holding company, Central Huijin Investment Company or simply Huijin.

During the 2013 Korean crisis, the China Construction Bank halted business with a North Korean bank accused by the United States of financing Pyongyang's missile and nuclear programs.

In 2015, China Construction Bank ranks the 2nd in Forbes’ 13th annual Global 2000 ranking of the biggest, most powerful and most valuable companies in the world.

In 2021, China Construction Bank ranks the 3rd largest bank around the world in Forbes' 2021 Global 2000 list. It ranks 5th in Forbes' 2022 Global 2000 list.

Investment by Bank of America 
In 2005, Bank of America acquired a 9% stake in China Construction Bank for US$3 billion. It represented the company's largest foray into China's growing banking sector. Bank of America currently has offices in Hong Kong, Shanghai, and Guangzhou and sought to expand its Chinese business as a result of this deal.

On or about 5 June 2008, Bank of America purchased 6 billion H-shares for approximately HK$2.42 per share using call options under a formula in the initial acquisition agreement. Bank of America now holds about 25.1 billion H-shares, representing about 10.75% of CCB's issued shares. Bank of America may not sell the 6 billion shares that it purchased from Huijin using the call option before 29 August 2011 without prior consent of CCB. Bank of America still has the option to purchase additional shares.

In May 2009, speculation was raised that US$7.3 billion worth of CCB shares had been sold by BoA after being ordered to obtain more capital following the results of the Dodd-Frank Act Annual Stress Test.

On 29 August 2011, Bank of America announced it would sell approximately half its stake in CCB (13.1 billion shares worth about US$8.3 billion) to an undisclosed group of investors.

In September 2013, Bank of America sold its remaining stake in the China Construction Bank for as much as $1.5 billion.

In June 2017, China Construction Bank (Malaysia) signs 13 Memorandum of Understandings on its opening day in Malaysia.

International expansion 
In 2006, CCB acquired Bank of America (Asia), which started in 1912 in Hong Kong as Bank of Canton, and had a subsidiary in Macao.

CCB opened a London office on 2 June 2009.

In 2008, CCB submitted an application to the New York State Banking Department and the Federal Reserve Board to establish a branch in New York City. CCB officially opened its New York branch on 6 June 2009.

In 2013, CCB opened its European Headquarters in Luxembourg.

In 2016, CCB Indonesia was founded by the merger between two banks: Bank Windu Kentjana and Bank Anda.

Health fund
China Construction Bank investment division launched a CN¥5 billion (US$731.3 million) fund called China Healthcare Investment Fund to focus on investments in China's rapidly growing healthcare sector. The fund focuses on investments in healthcare related sectors including pharmacy, medical equipment manufacturing, medical institutions and services. It is the first domestic investment fund specializing in investments in China's healthcare industry.

Stock exchanges listing 
In late 2005, China Construction Bank made an initial public offering on the Stock Exchange of Hong Kong. In late 2007, it made China's second-largest initial public offering of CN¥57.12 billion (US$7.6 billion) on the Shanghai Stock Exchange.

The bank is a component of Hang Seng Index, SSE 180 Index and other indexes of Pan-Chinese and Pan-Asia stock exchanges, such as CSI 300 Index, Hang Seng China 50 Index, FTSE China A50 Index and S&P Asia 50.

The bank was also a component of the Hang Seng China Enterprises Index.

Awards
 Global 2000 Rank #2 - World's Largest Public Companies in 2016

See also

Asset management in China

References

External links

 
 
 China Construction Bank New York ccbny.com
 China Construction Bank Singapore
 China Construction Bank Frankfurt ccbff.de
 China Construction Bank Johannesburg ccbjhd.com
 China Construction Bank Korea ccbseoul.com

 
Companies based in Beijing
Companies listed on the Hong Kong Stock Exchange
Companies listed on the Shanghai Stock Exchange
Banks established in 1954
Chinese brands
Companies in the Hang Seng Index
Government-owned companies of China
H shares
Systemically important financial institutions
Chinese companies established in 1954